The white-browed jungle flycatcher (Vauriella insignis), also known as the Luzon jungle-flycatcher and the Rusty-flanked jungle-flycatcher, is a species of bird in the Old World flycatcher family Muscicapidae.
It is endemic to Luzon island, in the Philippines. The natural habitat of the white-browed jungle flycatcher is tropical moist montane forests. It is threatened by habitat loss.

This species was previously placed in the genus Rhinomyias but was moved to Vauriella when a molecular phylogenetic study published in 2010 found that Rhinomyias was polyphyletic.

Description 
EBird describes the bird as "A medium-sized bird of montane forest in northern Luzon. Large for a flycatcher. Dark brown on the upperparts and chest, rufous on the sides with a white brow, throat, belly, and underside of the base of the tail. Superficially similar to Eyebrowed Thrush, but smaller, lacking the gray throat and yellow base to the bill. Voice consists of thin, high-pitched phrases and a short “shtck!."

Habitat and conservation status 
It is found in tropical moist primary montane Forest above 950 meters above sea level. It is often found in the understory.

IUCN Red List has assessed this bird as vulnerable with the population being estimated at 2,500 to 9,999 mature individuals. This species' main threat is habitat loss due o deforestation through mining, logging and conversion of habitat into farmland. Mossy forests of the Cordillera Central are threatened by conversion to agricultural land, primarily for vegetable production. Forest cover in the Sierra Madre has declined by 83% since the 1930s.

It occurs in a few protected areas like Mount Pulag National Park and Northern Sierra Madre Natural Park but as with most protected areas in the Philippines - protection and enforcement from habitat conversion and logging are  lax. 

Conservation actions proposed include to conduct surveys using mist-nets to determine its current distribution and status. Extend the Northern Sierra Madre Natural Park to incorporate Mt Los Dos Cuernos. Propose further known key sites (i,e. Mount Polis) for establishment as formal protected areas. Control habitat degradation in Mount Pulag National Park.

References

white-browed jungle flycatcher
Birds of Luzon
white-browed jungle flycatcher
Taxonomy articles created by Polbot